The 2008 New Mexico Lobos football team represented the University of New Mexico during the 2008 NCAA Division I FBS football season. New Mexico competed as a member of the Mountain West Conference (MW), and played their home games in the University Stadium. The Lobos were led by 11th-year head coach Rocky Long.

The Lobos upset ten-point favorites Arizona, 36–28. Against ninth-ranked BYU, New Mexico had a fourth quarter touchdown overturned due to a controversial penalty call. On fourth down with 21 yards to go, the Lobos then failed to convert for a first down. BYU scored on their next possession to clinch the victory, 21–3. New Mexico also played a close game against 10th-ranked Utah, which finished the season undefeated and ranked second in the nation. The Lobos were stopped at the Utes' goal line on fourth down, and eventually lost by a three-point margin.

New Mexico finished the season with a 4–8 record (MW: 2–6). It was the Lobos' first losing season in conference play since 2000. After the season, Rocky Long resigned as head coach. He was replaced by former Illinois offensive coordinator, Mike Locksley.

Schedule

References

New Mexico
New Mexico Lobos football seasons
New Mexico Lobos football